The president of the Executive Council of the Irish Free State was the head of government or prime minister of the Irish Free State which existed from 1922 to 1937. He was the chairman of the Executive Council of the Irish Free State, the Free State's cabinet. The president was appointed by the governor-general, upon the nomination of Dáil Éireann (the lower house of parliament) and had to enjoy the confidence of the Dáil to remain in office. The office was succeeded by that of taoiseach, though subsequent Taoisigh are numbered from the first president of the Executive.

Appointment
The president of the Executive Council was nominated by the Dáil and then formally appointed by the governor-general, though the governor-general was bound by constitutional convention to honour the Dáil's choice.

On paper, executive power was vested in the governor-general, with the Executive Council empowered to "aide and advise" him. However, it also stipulated that the governor-general could only exercise his powers in accordance with constitutional practice established in Canada. Thus, the governor-general was required to exercise his powers on the advice of the Executive Council, making the president of the council the Free State's de facto political leader.

Once he had appointed the president, the governor-general appointed the remaining members of the Executive Council on the president's nomination. The president had the freedom to choose any vice-president (deputy prime minister) he wished from among the members of the Dáil, but the remainder of the cabinet had to be approved by a vote of consent in the Dáil before they could assume office. If he ceased to "retain the support of a majority in Dáil Éireann," the president, along with his cabinet, was obliged to resign, but could continue to serve as acting president until the appointment of a successor.

The method of appointment of the president of the Executive Council was through a commission of the monarch or governor-general, either the leader of the party with a majority of seats in the lower house of parliament or, if no party commanded an absolute majority, whichever leader he believed would be best able to avoid a vote of no confidence.

Powers
The office of the president of the Executive Council was less powerful than either its modern equivalent, the office of taoiseach, or the offices of most modern prime ministers in nations that follow the parliamentary system of government. In particular, the powers of the president were subject to two important limitations:

He could not advise the governor-ceneral to dismiss a minister. Rather, the Executive Council had to be disbanded and reformed as a whole in order to replace a single minister.
He could not request a dissolution of parliament on his own initiative. This could only be done by the Executive Council acting collectively.

The result of these restrictions was, according to Brian Farrell, that the president of the Executive Council was closer to being the Executive Council's chairman or presiding officer, than its dominant leader. Nonetheless a strong president could exercise authority beyond the limits laid down in the 1922 constitution. The president's weak position arose from the fact that the status of his office was modelled on that of the prime minister of the United Kingdom before 1918. Under Prime Minister David Lloyd George, however, from 1918 onwards, the powers of the office increased, as Lloyd George unilaterally arrogated to himself a number of powers that had previously belonged to the Cabinet collectively, including, most significantly, the right to seek a parliamentary dissolution.

In 1931, the Statute of Westminster 1931 removed nearly all of the UK Parliament's authority to legislate for the Irish Free State, which effectively gave the Free State de jure independence. Soon after the Statute's passage, the Free State sought, and was granted, the right to have an Irish minister formally advise the King in the exercise of his powers and functions in the Irish Free State, to the exclusion of British ministers. This had the effect of giving the president of the Executive Council the right to advise the king in his capacity as His Majesty's Irish prime minister.

History
The office of president of the Executive Council came into being on 6 December 1922 with the establishment of the Irish Free State, replacing the previous offices of president of Dáil Éireann and chairman of the Provisional Government. Only two individuals held the office of president of the Executive Council during its existence: W. T. Cosgrave, until 1932, and Éamon de Valera thereafter. Under a constitutional amendment passed in 1936 and legislation passed in 1937 the office of governor-general was abolished, with most of his powers being transferred to the Executive Council. At the same time, the president of the Executive Council ceased to be formally appointed by the governor-general, thenceforth simply being elected by the Dáil.

The Irish Free State was reconstituted as 'Ireland' on 29 December 1937, when the present-day Constitution of Ireland came into effect. The new Constitution abolished the office of president of the Executive Council, replacing it with that of taoiseach (prime minister – literally meaning "Chieftain" or "Leader"). The Taoiseach occupies a more powerful position than the president of the Executive Council did and has authority both to dismiss ministers individually and to request a dissolution of parliament on his own initiative.

Officeholders

See also
Irish heads of government since 1919

Footnotes

References

Government in the Irish Free State